Rudolph Valentino (1895–1926) was an Italian-born actor in the era of silent films. He emigrated to the United States in 1913 and took a string of temporary menial jobs before becoming a film extra in 1914. He appeared in several films until 1921—many of which are now lost. That year he got his major break when he appeared in the role of Julio in The Four Horsemen of the Apocalypse. According to Valentino's biographer, Noel Botham, the film was "hailed ... [as] a masterpiece and Valentino as a star"; the film grossed $4.5 million at the North American box office.

Valentino played leading roles in fourteen films as a romantic figure. When he appeared in The Sheik in 1921, women fainted in the aisles of theaters; the film grossed $1.5 million. His second wife, Natacha Rambova, took increasing control of his career and image, although this meant his screen image turned "increasingly effeminate". The films in which he played a romantic role within the action genre were the more successful at the box office; these included his final two works The Eagle (1925) and The Son of the Sheik (1926). In 1995 The Four Horsemen of the Apocalypse was inducted into the United States National Film Registry by the Library of Congress as being "culturally, historically, or aesthetically significant"; a second Valentino film was inducted in 2003 when The Son of the Sheik was selected.

Valentino died suddenly of peritonitis on August 23, 1926, at the age of 31. His death at the height of his fame, and extensive media coverage, turned his funeral into a national event, at which large crowds attended. According to his biographer, Carl Rollyson, Valentino had a "... trim body, athletic grace, and dark good looks [which] made him an action hero and a romantic legend—the epitome of the silent screen's Latin lover".

Filmography

References and sources

References

Sources

 

Male actor filmographies
American filmographies
Filmography